Negra is a term for a quarter note.

Negra may also refer to:

 a common fig cultivar
 the feminine form of 'negro'
 Mano Negra (wrestler) (born 1951), Mexican Luchador

See also 
 La Negra (disambiguation)
 
 Negro (disambiguation)
 Negraș